The Ascarididae are a family of the large intestinal roundworms. Members of the family are intestinal parasites, infecting all classes of vertebrates. It includes a number of genera, the most well known of which are:   

Amplicaecum
Angusticaecum
Ascaris
†Ascarites (fossil)
Baylisascaris
Crossophorus
Dujardinascaris
Hexametra
Lagochilascaris
Ophidascaris
Parascaris
Polydelphis
Seuratascaris 
Toxascaris
Toxocara
Travassoascaris

Ascaris lumbricoides is the main ascarid parasite of humans, causing ascariasis.

References

External links 
ZipcodeZoo
AnimalDiversity Web
Wildlife Information
Uniprot Taxonomy
BioLib
TAMU
The Taxonomicon
Taxonomy at NEHU

Parasitic nematodes of vertebrates
Nematode families
Ascaridida